Rafael da Silva Santos (born 22 March 1979), known as Rafael, is a Brazilian former footballer who played as a defender. He spent one season in the Bundesliga with TSV 1860 Munich.

References

External links
Profile at Ogol

Brazilian footballers
Botafogo de Futebol e Regatas players
America Football Club (RJ) players
TSV 1860 Munich players
1. FC Nürnberg players
Paulista Futebol Clube players
1979 births
Living people
Association football defenders
Footballers from Rio de Janeiro (city)